John Richard Coy (born August 9, 1958) is an American children's and young adult author. He writes picture books, young adult novels and the 4 for 4 middle-grade series. He is best known for his books on basketball, Strong to the Hoop, Around the World, and Hoop Genius as well as Night Driving, Their Great Gift, and his coming-of-age novel, Crackback. He lives in Minneapolis, Minnesota and visits schools around the world.

Biography

Early life
Born in Minneapolis, Minnesota, John Richard Coy was the oldest of four children. His parents were both educators: Coy's father taught college history and his mother taught high school English. Graduating from Saint John's University in Collegeville, Minnesota, he later received his master of arts degree in children and creativity from St. Mary's University in Minneapolis, Minnesota. Coy worked at a variety of jobs—dishwasher, tour guide, mattress maker—before deciding on a career as a writer.

Career
His first picture book, Night Driving, was inspired by cross-country driving trips on which his father took his family of six when the author was young. John, the oldest, usually sat in front with his father, talking during the wee hours of the night, learning more about his dad than he did when the family was at home.

John's book Strong to the Hoop involved him in the National Basketball Association's Read to Achieve program. Strong to the Hoop was translated into Spanish as Directo al Aro four years later. The publisher asked that John write a book about basketball as it is played in countries all over the world. That book became Around the World.

Working with boys during school visits, talking to them, hearing the reasons they do and do not read, John has written books he would have liked reading as a teen. Crackback is set within the realities of high school football and Box Out perceptively follows a sophomore as he is called up to play varsity basketball. His third young adult novel Gap Life is about Cray Franklin, a boy whose parents will pay for college, but only if he studies what they want, which is not what he wants.

John's popular 4 for 4 series offers readers four novels about four friends engaged in sports, making the transition from elementary school to middle school. Middle grade readers will enjoy: Top of the Order, which is all about baseball; Eyes on the Goal, which tells an exciting soccer story; Love of the Game,', in which the four friends hope to make the football team; Take Your Best Shot, a hoops story that concludes the series.Strong to the Hoop, Night Driving, and Vroomaloom Zoom have been produced as children's theater throughout the United States.

John has worked as a librettist with the Minnesota Orchestra, an editor for the Youth Computer Center at the Science Museum of Minnesota, and a tour guide for the Minnesota Historical Society. He has also worked extensively with developmentally disabled adults and children.

Works

Published works
 Night Driving (1996), illustrated by Peter McCarty, picture book 
 Strong to the Hoop (1999), illustrated by Leslie Jean-Bart, picture book
 Vroomaloom Zoom (2000), illustrated by Joe Cepeda, picture book
 Directo al Aro (2002), ilustrado por Leslie Jean-Bart, traducido por Enrique del Risco, picture book
 Two Old Potatoes and Me (2003), illustrated by Carolyn Fisher, picture book
 Around the World (2005), illustrated by Antonio Reonegro and Tom Lynch, book
 Crackback (2005), novel
 Box Out (2009), novel
 Top of the Order (2009), novel, Book 1 of the 4 for 4 series
 Eyes on the Goal (2010), novel, Book 2 of the 4 for 4 series
 Love of the Game (2011), novel, Book 3 of the 4 for 4 series
 Take Your Best Shot (2012), novel, Book 4 of the 4 for 4 series
 For Extreme Sports-Crazy Boys Only (2015)
 Game Changer: John McLendon and the Secret Game (2016), picture book, illustrated by Randy DuBurke
 Their Great Gift: Courage, Sacrifice, and Hope in a New Land (2016), photographs by Wing Young Huie 
 Gap Life (2016), novel

Awards and honors

Night Driving
 1997 Marion Vannett Ridgway Memorial Award  for author's first book, Night Driving 1996 Choice Books, Cooperative Children's Book Center  
 1998 Best Children's Books of the Year, Bank Street College of Education 

Strong to the Hoop
 2000 American Library Association Notable Book 
 2000 Best Children's Books of the Year, Bank Street College of Education 
 2000 Notable Books for a Global Society, International Reading Association 

Vroomaloom Zoom
 2001 Children's Literature Choices list 
 2001 Best Children's Books of the Year, Bank Street College of Education 

Two Old Potatoes and Me
 2003 Best Family Books for the Year, Nickelodeon 
 2003 Best Children's Books of the Year, Bank Street College of Education 
 2003 Reading Rainbow book 
 2004 Charlotte Zolotow Honor book 

Around the World
 2005 Junior Library Guild 

Hoop Genius: How a Desperate Teacher and a Rowdy Gym Class Invented Basketball
 2013 Best Books for Kids and Teens, Canadian Children’s Book Centre 
 2013 Top Ten Sports Books for Youth, Booklist 
 2014 Choice Books, Cooperative Children's Book Center  
 2014 Best Children's Books of the Year, Bank Street College of Education 
 2015 Multicultural Book Collection, Reading is Fundamental 
 2015 National Endowment for the Humanities Nonfiction Favorites List for Young Readers 

Game Changer: John McLendon and the Secret Game
 2016 Orbis Pictus Recommended Book for Outstanding Nonfiction for Children, National Council of Teachers of English 
 2016 Notable Books for a Global Society, International Reading Association 
 Best Children's Books of the Year, with Outstanding Merit, Bank Street College of Education 
 2016 Elizabeth Burr/Worzalla Award for Distinguished Achievement in Children’s Literature, Wisconsin Library Association Youth Services Section 

Top of the Order
 2010 Junior Library Guild 
 2010 Choice Books, Cooperative Children's Book Center   
 2010 Best Children's Books of the Year, Bank Street College of Education 

Eyes on the Goal
 2011 Choice Books, Cooperative Children's Book Center  

Take Your Best Shot
 2013 Choice Books, Cooperative Children's Book Center  

Crackback
 2005 Junior Library Guild 
 2005 500 Great Books for Teens, Additional Title of Interest, by Anita Silvey  
 2006 Quick Picks for Reluctant Readers, YALSA 
 2007 Young Adults’ Choices, International Reading Association 

Box Out
 2009 Junior Library Guild 
 2009 Top Ten Sports Books for Youth, Booklist 

External links
 John Richard Coy's Home Page
 NBA Read to Achieve program
 Science Museum of Minnesota Thinking Fountain
 Feiwel and Friends publisher of Top of the Order Scholastic publisher of Crackback, Box Out Lee & Low publisher of Around the World''

Interviews
 2007 Minnesota Public Radio webcast, with author David LaRochelle, 26 December 2007
 2010 Minnesota Public Radio webcast, with Marianne Combs, 23 April 2010

1958 births
Living people
American children's writers